The Sharkfin Shoal Light was a screw-pile lighthouse located at the mouth of the Nanticoke River in Chesapeake Bay, US.

History
This light was constructed in 1892 to replace the Clay Island Light to the northeast. In 1964, the house was dismantled and a skeleton tower light placed on the foundation.

References

Sharkfin Shoal Light, from the Chesapeake Chapter of the United States Lighthouse Society

External links

Lighthouses completed in 1892
Lighthouses in Maryland
Transportation buildings and structures in Wicomico County, Maryland
Lighthouses in the Chesapeake Bay
Nanticoke River